"How 'Bout Us" is the most successful single released by R&B music group Champaign. Composed by band keyboardist Dana Walden and originally released on the band's debut album How 'Bout Us, the title track peaked at number 12 on the Billboard Hot 100. A romantic ballad, the song was released on Valentine's Day, 1981.

Song information
The song was originally released in 1975 by an earlier incarnation of the group, then called the Water Brothers Band. It was re-recorded by Champaign, and it was Champaign's version that became a hit single. "How 'Bout Us" peaked at number 4 on the soul chart and was one of three releases to make the Top 10 on the soul chart.  It was on the Hot 100 chart for 23 weeks, peaking at number 12 on June 6, 1981, and also reached the top of the Adult Contemporary chart for two weeks. Jet magazine listed the song in its "Soul Brothers Top 20 Singles" list for May and June 1981.

Chart performance

Weekly charts

Year-end charts

Cover versions
The song has been covered as a duet between established blue-eyed soul singer/musician Grayson Hugh and noted R&B singer Betty Wright; their version, from the soundtrack of the 1989 film True Love, peaked at number 30 on Billboard R&B chart, crossing over to number 67 on the pop singles chart.
A cover by American country music group Girls Next Door peaked at number 71 on the Billboard Hot Country Singles & Tracks chart in 1990.

See also
List of number-one adult contemporary singles of 1981 (U.S.)

References

1975 songs
1981 singles
Champaign (band) songs
Columbia Records singles
Girls Next Door songs